Telemachus is a character in Homer's Odyssey.

Telemachus may also refer to:

People
 Telemachus (Acragas) (fl. 554BC), leader of an uprising in Acragas, Sicily
 Saint Telemachus, monk and martyr
 Roger Telemachus, a South African cricketer
 Telemachus, a pseudonym for English rapper and DJ Forest DLG

Books and music
 "Telemachus" (Ulysses episode) an episode in James Joyce's novel Ulysses
 Les Aventures de Télémaque, an historically important popular work by François Fénelon
 Telemachus, pet cat who appears on the cover of Carole King's Tapestry

See also
 Telemaco (disambiguation)
 Telemaque (disambiguation)
 Temeluchus, a tartaruchus in the non-canonical Apocalypse of Paul